The 1872–73 season was the second season of competitive football by Queen's Park.

Overview
Queen's Park again entered the FA Cup in 1872–73. This was the only season the FA Cup was a true "challenge" cup. The defending champions were given a bye to the final with the remaining teams facing off against one another to determine who should challenge them for the trophy.

In order to reduce travel, Queen's Park were given byes through to the semi-finals where they were due to face Oxford University for the right to face defending champions Wanderers in the final. However, they withdrew before the match and Oxford University were given a walkover.

During the club's early years, the team would play in dark blue shirts and grey shorts. The now traditional black and white hoops weren't introduced until October 1873.

Results

FA Cup

Notes

Friendlies

References

1872–73
Queen's Park
1872–73 in Scottish football